Military Secretary is a senior position in the General Staff of the Sri Lanka Army, the post is held by a senior officer of the Major General rank. The Military Secretary's Branch is responsible for handling all matters pertaining to officers such as promotions, postings and discipline of the Sri Lanka Army. The current Military Secretary is Maj Gen W R P de Silva USP ndu IG. He assumed office on April 11th, 2019.

Past Military Secretaries
Brigadier Rohan Daluwatte
Brigadier M. H. Gunaratne
Major General Deepal Alwis
Major General Sunil Silva
Brigadier G.S. Padumadasa VSV USP
 Maj Gen H C P Goonetilleke RSP USP ndc psc
 Maj Gen S Ranasinghe RWP RSP ndu psc
 Maj Gen Ajith Wijesinghe USP ndu psc

References

External links
GRAND  FINALE  OF  BATTLES

Sri Lanka Army appointments